R. S. Sharma may refer to:

 Ram Sharan Sharma (1919–2011), Indian historian
 Ram Sewak Sharma (born 1955), Indian bureaucrat and CEO of UIDAI